Daniel Raoul (born 28 July 1941) is a member of the Senate of France, representing the Maine-et-Loire department. He is a member of the Socialist Party.

References
Page on the Senate website

1941 births
Living people
French Senators of the Fifth Republic
Socialist Party (France) politicians
Senators of Maine-et-Loire
Place of birth missing (living people)